Harm Peter Hofstee (born 1962) is a Dutch physicist and computer scientist who currently is a distinguished research staff member at IBM Austin, USA, and a part-time professor in Big Data Systems at Delft University of Technology, Netherlands.

Heterogeneous computing
Hofstee is best known for his contributions to Heterogeneous computing as the chief architect of the Synergistic Processor Elements in the Cell Broadband Engine processor used in the Sony PlayStation 3, and the first supercomputer to reach sustained Petaflop operation. After returning to IBM research in 2011 he has focused on optimizing the system roadmap for big data, analytics, and cloud, including the use of accelerated compute. His early research work on coherently attached reconfigurable acceleration on POWER7 paved the way for the new coherent attach processor interface on POWER8. Hofstee is an IBM Master Inventor with more than 100 issued patents.

Background
Hofstee was born in Groningen and obtained his master's degree in theoretical physics of the University of Groningen in 1988. He continued to study  at the California Institute of Technology where he wrote a master's thesis Constructing Some Distributed Programs in 1991 and obtained a Ph.D. with a thesis titled Synchronizing Processes in 1995. He joined Caltech as a lecturer for two years and moved to IBM in the Austin, Texas Research Laboratory, where he had staff member, senior technical staff member and distinguished engineer positions.

Previous Positions
1994 - 1996
Lecturer (Member of the Faculty) at California Institute of Technology,  Computer Science Department	
1996 - 2001
Research Staff Member at IBM Austin Research Laboratory
2001 - 2006
Senior Technical Staff Member, Cell SPE Chief Architect at IBM Microelectronics Division / IBM Systems and Technology Group
2006 - 2010	
Distinguished Engineer, Cell/B.E. Chief Scientist at IBM Systems and Technology Group

Current positions
2010–Present
Distinguished Research Staff  Member, Workload-Optimized and Hybrid Systems at IBM Austin Research Laboratory
2014–Present (part-time)
Professor, Big Data Systems at Delft University of Technology, the Netherlands

Since 2011, Peter is leading the Big Data system design work at IBM. In March 2016, Peter was appointed as professor to the chair of Big Data Computer Systems at the Faculty of Electrical Engineering, Mathematics and Computer Science at Delft University of Technology.

Awards
IBM Corporate Award
For Cell Broadband Engine, 2006
IBM Research Division Group Award
For Zebra/Ivy Grant Program Initiation, Jan. 2004 ( precursor to Roadrunner )
IBM Outstanding Technical Achievement Award
In appreciation for the world's first 1-GHz PowerPC Microprocessor, Feb. 1998
20th Annual Award for Excellence in Teaching, 
The Associated Students of the California Institute of Technology, 1995-96
Two IBM Graduate Fellowships (while at California Institute of Technology)
1991-1993

Memberships/Honors
IBM Master Inventor
Member, IBM Academy of Technology
Member of the Institute of Electrical and Electronics Engineers and Association for Computing Machinery

References

1962 births
Living people
Cell BE architecture
Computer architects
Computer designers
Dutch computer scientists
21st-century Dutch physicists
IBM employees
Scientists from Groningen (city)
University of Groningen alumni
California Institute of Technology alumni
California Institute of Technology faculty
Academic staff of the Delft University of Technology
Dutch expatriates in the United States